Stephan Volkert (born 7 August 1971 in Cologne) is a retired German rower. During his career Volkert became a two-time Olympic champion and six-time world champion.

References

External links
Leverkusen who's who

1971 births
Living people
German male rowers
Rowers at the 1992 Summer Olympics
Rowers at the 1996 Summer Olympics
Rowers at the 2000 Summer Olympics
Rowers at the 2004 Summer Olympics
Olympic rowers of Germany
Olympic gold medalists for Germany
Olympic bronze medalists for Germany
Olympic medalists in rowing
Medalists at the 2000 Summer Olympics
Medalists at the 1996 Summer Olympics
Medalists at the 1992 Summer Olympics
World Rowing Championships medalists for Germany
Rowers from Cologne